Kaio Fernando da Silva Pantaleão (born 18 September 1995), known mononymously as Kaio, is a Brazilian professional footballer who plays as a centre back for Russian club FC Krasnodar.

Career
Born in Araraquara, Brazil, Kaio is product of local Ferroviária youth ranks. On 22 July 2017, he started his first experience abroad, joining Santa Clara on a one-year loan deal. He made his debut for the Azorean team on 13 August 2017, in a 2–1 home win against Sporting da Covilhã.

Before the 2018–19 season, Santa Clara bought out his rights.

On 20 May 2019, he signed a 5-year contract with Russian Premier League club FC Krasnodar. On 3 March 2022, following the Russian invasion of Ukraine, Krasnodar announced that his contract is suspended and he will not train with the team, but the contract is not terminated and remains valid. Kaio returned to the club in June 2022.

Career statistics

References

External links
 

1995 births
People from Araraquara
Footballers from São Paulo (state)
Living people
Brazilian footballers
Association football defenders
Association football midfielders
Associação Ferroviária de Esportes players
C.D. Santa Clara players
FC Krasnodar-2 players
FC Krasnodar players
Primeira Liga players
Liga Portugal 2 players
Russian First League players
Russian Premier League players
Brazilian expatriate footballers
Expatriate footballers in Portugal
Brazilian expatriate sportspeople in Portugal
Expatriate footballers in Russia
Brazilian expatriate sportspeople in Russia